The Women's team pursuit competition at the 2020 World Single Distances Speed Skating Championships was held on February 14, 2020.

Results
The race was started at 16:01.

References

Women's team pursuit